A. Subba Rao (October 1919-14 September 2003) was an Indian politician and leader of Communist Party of India. He was former minister for Irrigation in Kerala from 25-01-1980 to 20-10-1981. He represented Manjeshwar constituency in 6th and 7th Kerala Legislative Assembly. He was member in Rajya sabha from 1958 to 1964.

References

Communist Party of India politicians from Kerala
1919 births
2003 deaths
Kerala MLAs 1980–1982
Kerala MLAs 1982–1987